Fever Marlene is a rock band from Milwaukee, Wisconsin, USA. Originally a two-piece, made up of Scott Starr (vocals, guitar, bass pedals, synth) and Kevin Dunphy (vocals, drums) the band emerged into the "garage rock" revival scene in early 2003.

Background
The two met while studying in Madison and started rehearsing together under the name The People. After quick stints in Los Angeles and Chicago, the duo moved back to Wisconsin and began recording as Fever Marlene, the name stemming from Starr's itch for vintage films and movie star Marlene Dietrich.

Expanding to a five-piece outfit, the band released "Medicated Friends" in 2013 featuring Dan Mahony (bass, guitar, vocals), Ryan Gardiner (synth, organs) and Christian Hansen (guitar, vocals., Fever Marlene writes, produces, records, mixes and masters all their own material in their self-built studio, called Dirty Earth.

HISTORY
Fever Marlene released their debut album titled, Civil War, on their own independent label Khemitones Records in 2007. The band has toured with the bands such as MGMT, The Flaming Lips, Social Distortion, The Redwalls, Donita Sparks, and Tapes N Tapes. Fever Marlene was the first band in Milwaukee since The Violent Femmes to add three songs to three separate radio stations in the area. During their first three years as a band they had gone through, "three zip codes and three complete artistic overhauls," before their debut Album, "Civil War". Fever Marlene wrote and recorded their second album, "White China", over a four night stay at New York's notorious Chelsea Hotel.

Band members
 Scott Starr – Vocals, Guitar, Bass Synth
 Kevin Dunphy – Drums, Vocals
 Dan Mahony – Bass Guitar, Vocals
 Christian Hansen – Guitars
 Ryan Gardiner – Synth, Organs, Vocals

Discography
Medicated Friends (Feb 03, 2013)
Febrile State(May 16, 2009)
White China (March 7, 2008)
Civil War (June 15, 2007)
Live In New York City (January 2007)

Further reading
"Fever Marlene finally unleashes "Civil War""; Julie Lawrence; June 6, 2007; onmilwaukee.com; Retrieved October 18, 2007
"Sundays with Summerfest"; July 2, 2007; madison.com; Retrieved October 18, 2007
"The Gufs bring a little Milwaukee to Madison... ...and Fever Marlene get ready for their big debut" ; Kiki Schueler; Madison Isthmus; March 30, 2007; Retrieved October 18, 2007

References

External links
 Fever Marlene at MySpace

Musical groups from Wisconsin